The Society for Canadian Women in Science and Technology (SCWIST), founded in Vancouver, BC in 1981, is a not-for-profit organization that promotes, encourages and empowers women and girls in science, engineering and technology.

History
SCWIST was founded in Vancouver, BC in 1981 by six women: Mary Vickers, Hilda Ching, Abby Schwarz, Mary Jo Duncan, Diana Herbst and Margaret Benston. It was registered as a charity under the federal Income Tax Act in 1984.

In 1983, the Registry of Skilled Women, BC and Yukon was produced. SCWIST also organized the first National Conference on Women in Science and Technology the same year. 
The members focused on girls and the development of the educational programs for them. The program Girls in Science started in 1984 and ran in many communities in BC. The program grew over the years into ms infinity (1990) and Project Tomorrow (1993). Ms infinity program is still ongoing. It is funded by Natural Sciences and Engineering Research Council and it inspires young women by introducing them to exciting careers in science and technology. Ms infinity program also offers an e-mentoring program for the girls in the 11th and 12th grades.

SCWIST established a first year achievement award for a female student enrolled in BCIT full-time technology program in 1986. This award was renamed in honour of Margaret Benston after her death in 1991 to Margaret Lowe Benston Memorial. The scholarship program expanded over the years.

The stability in SCWIST funding was achieved with the establishment of Michael Smith Endowment Fund in 1993. Half of the prize money from Nobel prize as well as the matching amount from different government  organizations was put into Vancouver Foundation's Michael Smith Fund.

The first SCWIST web site was launched in 1997. The update and new logos were done in 2012.

The most recent acknowledgement of the SCWIST value was done by Status of Women Canada. This grant funded a launch of an online mentorship network in 2014. This program (named makepossible) was developed to attract, retain and advance women in science and technology.

Immigrating Women in Science program (IWIS) started in 1999. It offers mentorship and other resources to women who have immigrated to Canada after having trained and established careers in science, engineering and technology in other countries. IWIS is partially funded by British Columbia Government. IWIS also creates opportunities for the skilled immigrants to express their opinions.

Other SCWIST activities include workshops, speaker's events and networking opportunities for women to make valuable academic and industry contacts and develop a sense of community with other women in scientific fields. The prominent event held yearly is XX evening organized in cooperation with Science World (Vancouver). Many other events are organized with the prominent partners such as CIHR Café Scientifique, Creating Connections  and many others.

From the six founders in 1981, membership in SCWIST has grown steadily into a network of women providing support to individuals, able to help when faced with the obstacles in the science and technology careers

Governance

SCWIST is incorporated under the BC Societies Act and governed by a Board of Directors. The Annual General Meeting held each spring and open to all members of the Society, votes on major decisions and elects directors. The Board is headed by the president and meets regularly in Vancouver.  The ongoing work of SCWIST is carried out by standing and ad hoc committees and paid employees appointed by the Board.

As of July 2015  there are 5 paid employees and the following committees are active: 
Communications
Events
Grants
IWIS
Membership
ms infinity
Strategic Development

Advocacy

Some members are vocal about current affairs such as women on Canadian one-hundred-dollar note and Canadian Status of Women Committee

References

External links
 APEGBC Innovation Magazine featuring Anna Stukas, Past President
 Vantage Point Guides Book 1 A People Lens featuring Linda Layton, SCWIST Director
 SCWIST - Volunteer week April 2009
 SCWIST - Volunteers 2009
  CCWESTT-Canadian Coalition of Women in Engineering, Science, Trades and Technology
  IEEE Women in Engineering in Canada
  Women in Engineering (Vancouver Region)

Charities based in Canada